The Ojo Alamo Formation is a geologic formation in New Mexico spanning the Mesozoic/Cenozoic boundary. Non-avian dinosaur fossils have controversially been identified in beds of this formation dating from after the Cretaceous–Paleogene extinction event, but these have been explained as either misidentification of the beds in question or as reworked fossils, fossils eroded from older beds and redeposited in the younger beds.

Description
The Ojo Alamo Formation is divided into two subunits separated by a large unconformity—a gap in the geologic record. The lower Naashoibito member (sometimes considered part of the Kirtland Formation) was deposited during the Maastrichtian age of the Cretaceous period, specifically between about 69-68 million years ago. It overlies the De-na-zin member of the Kirtland formation, though the two are separated by another large unconformity that spans a period of geologic time equivalent to 73-69 million years ago. All dinosaur fossils probably come from this unit.

The upper unit of the Ojo Alamo Formation is the Kimbeto Member, which was deposited mainly during the earliest Cenozoic (Danian age of the Paleogene period), between 66 and 64 million years ago.

Fossils 

Dinosaur remains are among the fossils that have been recovered from the formation, though all dinosaur remains come from the lowest part of the formation, the Naashoibito member (sometimes considered part of the Kirtland Formation, which dates to the late Maastrichtian stage of the Cretaceous period.

Some researchers have claimed to find isolated non-avian dinosaur remains in the younger Kimbeto Member. If this is the case, it would represent the only known instance of a non-avian dinosaur population persisting after the Cretaceous–Paleogene extinction event. However, most scientists consider these to have been stratigraphically misinterpreted or reworked from the older Naashoibito member.

Alamo Wash fauna 
The following species are known to be present in the Naashoibito Member "Alamo Wash Fauna".

Fish

Amphibians

Testudines

Squamates

Crocodylians

Dinosaurs

Pterosaurs

Mammals

History of investigation 
The formation was named by Barnum Brown in 1910 for exposures near Ojo Alamo springs in the San Juan Basin. Baltz et al. reassigned the lower beds to the Kirtland Formation in 1966, but this has not been generally accepted.

See also 

 List of dinosaur-bearing rock formations

References

Further reading 
 

 
Geologic formations of the United States
Cretaceous geology of New Mexico
Paleogene geology of New Mexico
Natural history of New Mexico
Fossiliferous stratigraphic units of North America
Paleontology in the United States